The TI-81 was the first graphing calculator made by Texas Instruments. It was designed in 1990 for use in algebra and precalculus courses. Since its release, it has been superseded by a series of newer calculators: the TI-85, TI-82, TI-83, TI-86, TI-83 Plus, TI-83 Plus Silver Edition, TI-84 Plus, TI-84 Plus Silver Edition, TI-84 Plus C Silver Editon TI-Nspire, TI-Nspire CAS, TI-84 Plus CE, and most recently, the TI-84 Plus CE Python. Most of them share the original feature set and 96×64-pixel display that began with this calculator, with the exceptions of the TI-84 Plus C Silver Edition and the TI-84 Plus CE family.

Features
The TI-81 is powered by a Zilog Z80 microprocessor, like those used in almost every other Texas Instruments graphing calculator (except the TI-80, TI-89, TI-89 Titanium, TI-92, TI-92 Plus, Voyage 200 and TI-Nspire series). However, the processor is clocked at 2 MHz whereas the other Z80-powered Texas Instruments calculators run at speeds of at least 6 MHz (the TI-83 Plus Silver Edition, TI-84 Plus, and TI-84 Plus Silver Edition can run at 15 MHz). It contains 2400 bytes of user RAM, with additional RAM used internally by the calculator firmware software system.

The TI-81's user interactions are provided by its so-called Equation Operation System. This is comparable to the interface provided by the more recent TI-82, TI-83, and so on. This system is capable of such tasks as two-dimensional parametric graphing (in addition to standard two-dimensional function graphing), trigonometric calculations in units of either degrees or radians, simple drawing capabilities, creation and manipulation of matrices up to 6x6 in size, and programming in a proprietary statement-based language.

In late 2009 an exploit was found that can be used to execute machine code on the TI-81, using manual input of code.  The TI-81 has no data link interface; its only means of input and output are the keyboard and screen.

As with its successors, the TI-81 is powered by four AAA batteries and one CR1616 or CR1620 lithium backup battery (to ensure programs are persistent when the AAA batteries are being changed). Some early TI-81 units omit the backup battery; if the AAA batteries of one of these units are changed one at a time and quickly, the memory contents are still retained.

Texas Instruments distributes software which emulates the TI-81 and its Equation Operating System on a desktop computer using MS-DOS or DOSBox.

See also
Comparison of Texas Instruments graphing calculators

References

External links
ticalc.org – The largest archive of TI programs available.

Graphing calculators
Texas Instruments programmable calculators
Products introduced in 1990
Z80